The Crambidae is the grass moth family of lepidopterans. They are variable in appearance, the nominal subfamily Crambinae (grass moths) taking up closely folded postures on grass stems where they are inconspicuous, while other subfamilies include brightly coloured and patterned insects which rest in wing-spread attitudes.

In many classifications, the Crambidae have been treated as a subfamily of the Pyralidae or snout moths. The principal difference is a structure in the tympanal organs called the praecinctorium, which joins two tympanic membranes in the Crambidae, and is absent from the Pyralidae. The latest review by Munroe and Solis, in Kristensen (1999), retains the Crambidae as a full family. The family currently comprises 15 subfamilies with altogether 10,347 species in over 1,000 genera.

Systematics

subfamilia incertae sedis
Conotalis Hampson, 1919
Exsilirarcha Salmon & Bradley, 1956
Subfamily Acentropinae Stephens, 1836
Subfamily Crambinae Latreille, 1810
Subfamily Erupinae Munroe, 1995
Subfamily Glaphyriinae Forbes, 1923 (= Evergestinae Marion, 1952, Noordinae Minet, 1980, Cybalomiinae Marion, 1955, Cathariinae Minet, 1982)
Subfamily Heliothelinae Amsel, 1961
Subfamily Hoploscopinae Robinson et al., 1994
Subfamily Lathrotelinae Clarke, 1971
Subfamily Linostinae Amsel, 1956
Subfamily Midilinae Munroe, 1958
Subfamily Musotiminae Meyrick, 1884
Subfamily Odontiinae Guenée, 1854
Subfamily Pyraustinae Meyrick, 1890
Subfamily Schoenobiinae Duponchel, 1846
Subfamily Scopariinae Guenée, 1854
Subfamily Spilomelinae Guenée, 1854 (= Wurthiinae Roepke, 1916)

Relationship with humans
Since crambids are relatively common throughout human settlements, the moths tend to affect crops and gardens, whether harmfully, beneficially or harmlessly. Beneficial crambids include the water hyacinth moth (Niphograpta albiguttalis), used to control its host (Eichhornia crassipes), the water veneer (Acentria ephemerella), a biocontrol agent used against Eurasian watermilfoil, and the bamboo borer (Omphisa fuscidentalis), of which the caterpillars are used for human consumption. The mint moth (Pyrausta aurata) is an example of a harmless crambid.

Crambid larvae are typically stem borers in plants of the grass family. As this family contains many important crops, some Crambidae species achieve pest status. The European corn borer Ostrinia nubilalis is perhaps the best known; introduced to the United States in the early 1900s, it is now widespread in all but the westernmost states. Other pest species include the pearl millet stem borer (Coniesta ignefusalis), the spotted stalk borer (Chilo partellus), the Asiatic rice borer (Chilo suppressalis), sod webworms (Crambus spp.), Duponchelia fovealis, the sugarcane borer (Diatraea saccharalis), bean pod borers (Maruca spp.), the rice white stemborer (Scirpophaga innotata), the southwestern corn borer (Diatraea grandiosella), and the grape leaffolder (Desmia maculalis).

Gallery

See also
 List of crambid genera

References

Further reading
 Kristensen, N.P. (Ed.). 1999. Lepidoptera, Moths and Butterflies. Volume 1: Evolution, Systematics, and Biogeography. Handbuch der Zoologie. Eine Naturgeschichte der Stämme des Tierreiches / Handbook of Zoology. A Natural History of the phyla of the Animal Kingdom. Band / Volume IV Arthropoda: Insecta Teilband / Part 35: 491 pp. Walter de Gruyter, Berlin, New York.

External links

 "Family Crambidae". Insecta.pro
 Synclita obliteralis, waterlily leafcuter on the UF / IFAS Featured Creatures Web site
Diatraea saccharalis, sugarcane borer
Grape Leaffolder Moth Cirrus Digital

 
Moth families
Articles containing video clips
Taxa named by Pierre André Latreille